"Devil" is a song by American rock band Shinedown. It was their first single off of their sixth studio album Attention Attention. It reached number one on the US Billboard Mainstream Rock Songs chart in May 2018.

Background
The song was first released on March 7, 2018, as the first single from the band's sixth studio album, Attention Attention. An accompanying music video was released on the same day, also including the intro track "The Entrance" at the beginning of the video. The video was directed by Bill Yukich, who had previously directed the videos for Beyonce's Lemonade videos for HBO. The song is included in WWE 2K19's soundtrack, being selected by Baron Corbin to appear in game. The Song was also included in the Apex Legends Season 3 cinematic trailer.

Themes and composition
Lyrically, the song has been described by Alternative Press as "a deep dive into the heart of fear". Attention Attention is a concept album that details a person's progression, from being in a dark, negative space, to working through their issues and eventually progressing into be a new, more positive person; "Devil" is the second track from the album, and the first fully formed song after the intro track, placing it in the more negativity-themed side of the album. Frontman Brent Smith outlined the meaning of the song:

Musically, Loudwire described the song as having a dense, wall of sound quality to it, describing it as having a "sliding guitar lick and off kilter beat"...backing choirs.. layers of synth, piano and guitar textures."

Personnel
Band
 Brent Smith – vocals
 Zach Myers – guitar
 Eric Bass – bass
 Barry Kerch – drums

Charts

Weekly charts

Year-end charts

Certifications

References

2018 singles
2018 songs
Shinedown songs
Songs written by Brent Smith
Songs written by Eric Bass